Tamchal (also Romanized as Tamchāl and Tomchal; also known as Temīchāl, Tīmchāl, and Yatamchal) is a village in Kurka Rural District, in the Central District of Astaneh-ye Ashrafiyeh County, Gilan Province, Iran. At the 2006 census, its population was 718, in 196 families.

References 

Populated places in Astaneh-ye Ashrafiyeh County